The House of Barbo (later Barbo zu / von Waxenstein ) is an Carniolan noble family of Italian origin, active mostly in the territory of present-day Slovenia and in Istria.

History 
The Barbo family originated in Veneto, later moving to Inner Austria, especially Carniola (present-day Slovenia). They claimed descendence from Roman Emperor Claudius. In 1547 the family settled in Kožljak (Waxenstein, in German) in Habsburg Istria. They were elevated to the rank of barons in 1622, and to the rank of counts in 1674.

The family produced one Pope, Paul II, and several high-ranking officials and politicians in the Duchy of Carniola. The last male member, count Robert Barbo von Waxenstein died in 1977. He had one daughter, Countess Livia Barbo von Waxenstein, later Baroness von Reden (1921-2018).

Notable family members 
 Pietro Barbo - later became Pope Paul II
 Giovanni Barbo - Bishop of Pedena
 Ludovico Barbo - Abbot of Santa Giustina
 Marco Barbo - Catholic Cardinal and Patriarch of Aquileia
 Pantaleone Barbo - Bailo of Corfu
 Franz Engelbert Barbo von Waxenstein - Titular Bishop of Dara, Auxiliary Bishop of Breslau
 Count Joseph Emanuel Barbo von Waxenstein - Slovenian politician
 Count Josef Anton Barbo von Waxenstein - Austrian politician, son of Josef Emanuel
 Count Robert Barbo von Waxenstein - Slovenian-Austrian author, son of Josef Anton
 Countess Stella Barbo von Waxenstein - daughter of Josef Anton, daughter-in-law of Hugo II Logothetti
 Countess Maria Gertrude Valeska Rosa Aloisia Barbo von Waxenstein - daughter of Josef Anton, wife of Gilbert von In der Maur
 Wolf In der Maur - Austrian journalist, son of Maria Gertrude and Gilbert von In der Maur

References 

Barbo family
Papal families
Austrian noble families
Italian noble families
Slovene nobility
Noble families of the Holy Roman Empire
Families of Italian ancestry